Events from the year 1418 in Ireland.

Incumbent
Lord: Henry V

Events
 The Great Book of Lecan is completed at Enniscrone. (Started in 1397).
 James FitzGerald, 6th Earl of Desmond deprived Thomas FitzGerald, 5th Earl of Desmond of his earldom and dispossess him for marrying far below his station. The marriage between a man of Norman ancestry and a woman of Gaelic blood was in violation of the Statutes of Kilkenny.

Births
 James Ormonde, Lord Treasurer of Ireland, Earl of Ormonde

Deaths
Gilla Isa Mor mac Donnchadh MacFhirbhisigh, historian, scribe and poet.

References

 
1410s in Ireland
Ireland
Years of the 15th century in Ireland